Owego may refer to two locations in Tioga County, New York:
 Owego (village), New York
 Owego (town), New York

See also 
 Oswego (disambiguation)